According to local tradition, in 1757, the second year of the French and Indian War east of the Susquehanna River, a massacre of the Spatz family at a spring near modern-day Strausstown, PA caused the water to run red with the blood of the family. That small trickle of water became known as “Bloody Spring” and the event has been called the “Bloody Spring Massacre" since that time. The story of the massacre has been passed down through the Degler family, whose farm neighbored the Spatz homestead.

Massacre of the Spatz family 
One version is that someone in the Spatz family killed an Indian and in retaliation his companions killed the entire family. George Frederick Degler, a German pioneer who settled in Berks County in 1738, is said to have had a reputation among the Indians of this area as a fair and kind man. However, by 1757, warriors of the Lenape, the original inhabitants of the Schuylkill Valley who had moved westward to the Ohio Valley, were attacking settlers south of the Blue Mountain in the vicinity of the Spatz and Degler homesteads. There are various versions of the Spatz and Degler stories, but no contemporaneous accounts (such as military journals or reports to colonial authorities) have been found. One popular version of the story is that after hearing Indian war whoops at the Spatz farm next door, the Deglers fled to nearby Fort Northkill, leaving their homestead unoccupied. Upon returning home weeks later, they found the house ransacked and a family chest brought from Germany by Mr. Degler chopped open.

Berks County and Tulpehocken Township During the French and Indian War 

The word Tulpehocken is of Indian origin meaning “Land of Turtles.”

At the time of the Bloody Spring massacre, Tulpehocken Township had become the frontier in the French and Indian War, as the few white settlers who had established farms north of the Blue Mountain fled southward. The French and Indian War is the only armed conflict in which people were killed within the borders of Berks County.

Conrad Weiser, Pennsylvania's long-time ambassador to the Six Nations of the Iroquois in today's central New York, directed the construction of forts to protect the German farm families in the northern part of Tulpehocken Township (now Upper Tulpehocken Township established in 1820) from Native American attacks. One of these forts built for that purpose was Fort Northkill, erected in early 1756 following the initial Lenape incursion in November 1755. However, the small stockade (approximately 32 feet square) was poorly constructed, and the hastily built house inside was ill-suited to shelter refugees in inclement weather.

On October 1, 1757, the Lenape from the Ohio Valley attacked again near Fort Northkill in Tulpehocken Township.

An application was made to Conrad Weiser in Reading for help. Captain Oswald sent two lieutenants and forty men to assist residents in that area. Conrad Weiser was forced to choose between the Iroquois and the Lenape tribes due to political pressures.

William Penn signed a peace agreement with the Lenape tribe, who were not organized like the Iroquois. Lenape were most respected as native peoples after the peace treaty with William Penn was signed.  However, as conflict between the English and the French escalated, the Iroquois became the pivotal tribe for alliance. As a result, Conrad Weiser had to allow the Iroquois and the settlers to “run over the Lenape.” 

German settlers forced the Lenape out of Berks County. The Lenape had been pushed up the Schuylkill River over time. Then the Lenape moved out of Berks County and westward towards Pittsburgh, but were resentful about it.  Several generations after William Penn and the peace treaty, the Lenape adopted a lot of European ways and needed gunpowder and to have their families fed while they were gone. The French offered this support for the Lenape to return to attack settlers in Berks County in small raiding parties. The Lenape traveled on foot for these attacks. The Lenape lived in the Ohio Valley at the time of the Bloody Spring massacre and were angry about being moved there from Berks County.

One hundred and fifty Berks County residents were killed and about 150 were kidnapped by the Lenape tribe during the French and Indian War.  Some Berks County residents in 1755 were Amish, and did not believe in violence, and so were killed when the Lenape attacked their homes and kidnapped women and children to replenish the number in their tribe. Often the kidnapped people would be ransomed back, but not always.  At the end of the French and Indian War, a number of captives decided to remain with the tribes that kidnapped them because they had integrated into the tribe.

The Reading courthouse has a display of Indian Massacres in Berks County in hallway between annex and main courthouse, marking the estate of people who died from wounds from Indian attacks, so the French and Indian War affects the legal history of Berks County as well through probate cases.

Fort Dietrich Snyder was situated north of Strausstown and about two miles west of Fort Northkill.  This fort was used as an observation post, from which burning homesteads could be seen for miles.

The Degler Chest 

George F. Degler emigrated from Germany in 1738 and settled on what was then Berks County's northern frontier, near present-day Strausstown in Upper Tulpehocken Township in Pennsylvania.
He brought with him a cedar chest, which would become a treasured family heirloom.

After killing the Spatz family, the Lenape Indians went to the Degler home and ransacked it.  It included breaking open a cedar chest Degler had brought from his native Germany with tomahawks.  When Degler returned to his home, the Indians apologized for breaking the chest and repaired it.  “As a token of the regained friendship the Indians repaired the chest top which they had split and carved on it two fish, as a sign that the Deglers gave the Indians food; a heart symbol of friendship, and crossed canoe paddles, emblem of peace. Degler carved his initials on the chest, brought with him from his native Germany, and the year of the brief uprising, 1752.”
The Indians repaired the chest and, as a token of renewed friendship, carved tribal symbols into it. They included two fish, a sign Degler had given them food; a heart, symbolizing friendship; and crossed canoe paddles, emblems of peace. To commemorate the event, Degler carved "GFD: 1752" on the chest.
"The Degler family intended to preserve this chest and had it from one generation to the other as a relic of the fearful conflicts with the Indians which their forefathers had in the early settlement of the country."  Mrs. Minnie Degler Stertzel explained, a great-granddaughter of the pioneer Degler.

Mrs. Stertzel told of a family agreement regarding the Degler Chest that has been in force since that day in 1752.  The chest would never be taken from the Degler homestead, but would remain there as a mute reminder of early pioneer struggles. “To remind them of the fearful conflicts with the indians they had endured.”

The chest has only been away from the homestead once. The occasion was a special Fourth of July celebration during World War II in 1942.

Mrs. Stertzeil keeps a detailed family record of the chest's possession, tracing it from her great-grandfather to the prest day.
The family ledger shows the following chain of ownership:
George F. Degler, brought the chest from Germany, 1738. 
Ownership passed to a son, Frederick Jacob Degler, 1755. 
To John Frederick Degler, 1787
To George Frederick Degler 1827
to John W. Degler 1855
To Frederick Jacob Degler, 1888
To Phoebe Degler Henninger1914
To Dora Degler Henninger Wagner 1937
and now to Mrs. Stertzel.
Mrs. Stertzel traces her lineage through Charles Degler, her father; to Jerry Degler, her grandfather and George Degler, her great-grandfather.

Haunting of Bloody Springs 

The Spirit Society of Pennsylvania (SSP), a ghost investigative group, went to Bloody Springs in 2008 and one of its members allegedly saw the dead Spatz family in her mind's eye lying in the creek bed.

References

History of Pennsylvania
French and Indian War